Uma Saren (born 9 May 1984) is an Indian politician who has been a Member of Lok Sabha for Jhargram since 2014. She belongs to Trinamool Congress. A medical practitioner by profession, she is the first person to speak in the Santali language in the Inter-Parliamentary Union.

Early life
Saren was born on 9 May 1984. Her father worked with the Indian Railways as a Group D staff. She received a M.B.B.S. degree from Nil Ratan Sircar Medical College and Hospital in 2012. She belongs to the Santhal community.

Political career
In 2012, Saren joined Junglemahal Bhoomiputra and Kanya Medical Association whose aim was to provide medical facilities in remote areas to the tribals in the Bengal-Jharkhand border.

On 5 May 2014, Trinamool Congress party announced that Saren would contest the upcoming general election from Jhargram constituency. She was pitted against Communist Party of India (Marxist) candidate Pulin Bihari Baske. In May, she was elected to the Lok Sabha and defeated Baske by a margin of 3,50,756 votes. She became the first ever woman Santhal MP of India. She also won with the highest margin in her state.
In 2014, she was the member of two standing parliamentary committees: the Standing Committee on Chemicals and Fertilizers and the Consultative Committee on Ministry of Tribal Affairs.

In April 2017, Saren utilised  from her MPLADS funds to buy ceiling fans, LED lamps and water coolers for 3,000 schools in the state.

On 28 May 2018, Saren became the first person to speak in the Santali language in the Inter-Parliamentary Union. She spoke about the many problems faced by various tribes in India. She was also the only woman in the Indian delegation which consisted of seven members.

On 12 March 2019, the party announced that they had not renominated Saren for the next general election. Partymen alleged that she properly did not use the MPLADS funds.

References

External links
Lok Sabha profile

India MPs 2014–2019
Living people
1984 births
People from Paschim Medinipur district
Lok Sabha members from West Bengal
Women in West Bengal politics
Trinamool Congress politicians from West Bengal
21st-century Indian women politicians
21st-century Indian politicians
Indian women medical doctors